The 1984-85 NBA season was the Bucks' 17th season in the NBA. For the first time since 1976-77 season, Marques Johnson was not on the opening day roster.

Draft picks

Roster

Regular season

Season standings

z - clinched division title
y - clinched division title
x - clinched playoff spot

Record vs. opponents

Game log

Regular season

|- align="center" bgcolor="#ccffcc"
| 1
| October 27, 1984
| Chicago
| W 108–106
|
|
|
| MECCA Arena
| 1–0
|- align="center" bgcolor="#ffcccc"
| 2
| October 29, 1984
| @ Chicago
| L 110–116
|
|
|
| Chicago Stadium
| 1–1
|- align="center" bgcolor="#ccffcc"
| 3
| October 31, 1984
| Washington
| W 105–79
|
|
|
| MECCA Arena
| 2–1

|- align="center" bgcolor="#ccffcc"
| 4
| November 2, 1984
| @ Washington
| W 102–96
|
|
|
| Capital Centre
| 3–1
|- align="center" bgcolor="#ccffcc"
| 5
| November 3, 1984
| Cleveland
| W 117–88
|
|
|
| MECCA Arena
| 4–1
|- align="center" bgcolor="#ccffcc"
| 6
| November 7, 1984
| Atlanta
| W 103–99
|
|
|
| MECCA Arena
| 5–1
|- align="center" bgcolor="#ccffcc"
| 7
| November 9, 1984
| Indiana
| W 122–105
|
|
|
| MECCA Arena
| 6–1
|- align="center" bgcolor="#ffcccc"
| 8
| November 10, 1984
| @ Detroit
| L 100–104
|
|
|
| Pontiac Silverdome
| 6–2
|- align="center" bgcolor="#ccffcc"
| 9
| November 13, 1984
| @ Atlanta
| W 110–99
|
|
|
| The Omni
| 7–2
|- align="center" bgcolor="#ccffcc"
| 10
| November 15, 1984
| @ L.A. Clippers
| W 103–90
|
|
|
| Los Angeles Memorial Sports Arena
| 8–2
|- align="center" bgcolor="#ffcccc"
| 11
| November 16, 1984
| @ Phoenix
| L 106–118
|
|
|
| Arizona Veterans Memorial Coliseum
| 8–3
|- align="center" bgcolor="#ffcccc"
| 12
| November 18, 19849:30p.m. CST
| @ L.A. Lakers
| L 89–96
| Cummings (29)
| Cummings (10)
| Dunleavy, Pressey (6)
| The Forum12,768
| 8–4
|- align="center" bgcolor="#ffcccc"
| 13
| November 20, 1984
| @ Dallas
| L 108–109
|
|
|
| Reunion Arena
| 8–5
|- align="center" bgcolor="#ccffcc"
| 14
| November 21, 1984
| Chicago
| W 108–98
|
|
|
| MECCA Arena
| 9–5
|- align="center" bgcolor="#ccffcc"
| 15
| November 24, 1984
| Golden State
| W 103–97
|
|
|
| MECCA Arena
| 10–5
|- align="center" bgcolor="#ffcccc"
| 16
| November 27, 1984
| @ Indiana
| L 105–126
|
|
|
| Market Square Arena
| 10–6
|- align="center" bgcolor="#ffcccc"
| 17
| November 28, 1984
| @ Atlanta
| L 83–95
|
|
|
| Lakefront Arena
| 10–7
|- align="center" bgcolor="#ccffcc"
| 18
| November 30, 1984
| New York
| W 118–100
|
|
|
| MECCA Arena
| 11–7

|- align="center" bgcolor="#ffcccc"
| 19
| December 1, 1984
| @ Washington
| L 97–100
|
|
|
| Capital Centre
| 11–8
|- align="center" bgcolor="#ffcccc"
| 20
| December 5, 1984
| @ Philadelphia
| L 111–112
|
|
|
| The Spectrum
| 11–9
|- align="center" bgcolor="#ccffcc"
| 21
| December 6, 1984
| Detroit
| W 114–99
|
|
|
| MECCA Arena
| 12–9
|- align="center" bgcolor="#ccffcc"
| 22
| December 8, 1984
| Indiana
| W 99–96
|
|
|
| MECCA Arena
| 13–9
|- align="center" bgcolor="#ccffcc"
| 23
| December 11, 1984
| @ Cleveland
| W 120–106
|
|
|
| Richfield Coliseum
| 14–9
|- align="center" bgcolor="#ffcccc"
| 24
| December 12, 1984
| @ New Jersey
| L 109–116
|
|
|
| Brendan Byrne Arena
| 14–10
|- align="center" bgcolor="#ffcccc"
| 25
| December 14, 1984
| Philadelphia
| L 111–115
|
|
|
| MECCA Arena
| 14–11
|- align="center" bgcolor="#ccffcc"
| 26
| December 16, 1984
| Utah
| W 115–102
|
|
|
| MECCA Arena
| 15–11
|- align="center" bgcolor="#ccffcc"
| 27
| December 18, 1984
| Dallas
| W 110–96
|
|
|
| MECCA Arena
| 16–11
|- align="center" bgcolor="#ccffcc"
| 28
| December 19, 1984
| @ Boston
| W 107–92
|
|
|
| Boston Garden
| 17–11
|- align="center" bgcolor="#ccffcc"
| 29
| December 21, 1984
| @ Philadelphia
| W 104–101
|
|
|
| The Spectrum
| 18–11
|- align="center" bgcolor="#ccffcc"
| 30
| December 22, 1984
| San Antonio
| W 101–90
|
|
|
| MECCA Arena
| 19–11
|- align="center" bgcolor="#ccffcc"
| 31
| December 26, 1984
| Houston
| W 97–87
|
|
|
| MECCA Arena
| 20–11
|- align="center" bgcolor="#ccffcc"
| 32
| December 29, 1984
| @ Cleveland
| W 115–102
|
|
|
| Richfield Coliseum
| 21–11
|- align="center" bgcolor="#ccffcc"
| 33
| December 30, 1984
| Boston
| W 114–98
|
|
|
| MECCA Arena
| 22–11

|- align="center" bgcolor="#ccffcc"
| 34
| January 3, 1985
| L.A. Clippers
| W 111–87
|
|
|
| MECCA Arena
| 23–11
|- align="center" bgcolor="#ffcccc"
| 35
| January 4, 1985
| @ Chicago
| L 101–106
|
|
|
| Chicago Stadium
| 23–12
|- align="center" bgcolor="#ffcccc"
| 36
| January 5, 1985
| Philadelphia
| L 106–110
|
|
|
| MECCA Arena
| 23–13
|- align="center" bgcolor="#ffcccc"
| 37
| January 8, 1985
| Washington
| L 95–99
|
|
|
| MECCA Arena
| 23–14
|- align="center" bgcolor="#ccffcc"
| 38
| January 9, 1985
| @ Indiana
| W 106–105
|
|
|
| Market Square Arena
| 24–14
|- align="center" bgcolor="#ccffcc"
| 39
| January 11, 1985
| Cleveland
| W 130–117
|
|
|
| MECCA Arena
| 25–14
|- align="center" bgcolor="#ccffcc"
| 40
| January 13, 1985
| Denver
| W 140–116
|
|
|
| MECCA Arena
| 26–14
|- align="center" bgcolor="#ccffcc"
| 41
| January 15, 19857:30p.m. CST
| L.A. Lakers
| W 115–105
| Cummings (39)
| Cummings, Lister (9)
| Pressey (12)
| MECCA Arena11,052
| 27–14
|- align="center" bgcolor="#ccffcc"
| 42
| January 18, 1985
| New Jersey
| W 102–93
|
|
|
| MECCA Arena
| 28–14
|- align="center" bgcolor="#ccffcc"
| 43
| January 24, 1985
| @ Kansas City
| W 120–119
|
|
|
| Kemper Arena
| 29–14
|- align="center" bgcolor="#ccffcc"
| 44
| January 26, 1985
| @ Houston
| W 105–102
|
|
|
| The Summit
| 30–14
|- align="center" bgcolor="#ccffcc"
| 45
| January 27, 1985
| @ San Antonio
| W 106–93
|
|
|
| HemisFair Arena
| 31–14
|- align="center" bgcolor="#ccffcc"
| 46
| January 29, 1985
| @ Golden State
| W 108–101
|
|
|
| Oakland-Alamdea County Coliseum Arena
| 32–14

|- align="center" bgcolor="#ccffcc"
| 47
| February 1, 1985
| @ Seattle
| W 109–91
|
|
|
| Kingdome
| 32–15
|- align="center" bgcolor="#ccffcc"
| 48
| February 2, 1985
| @ Portland
| W 105–95
|
|
|
| Memorial Coliseum
| 33–15
|- align="center" bgcolor="#ffcccc"
| 49
| February 4, 1985
| Detroit
| L 111–113 (OT)
|
|
|
| MECCA Arena
| 34–15
|- align="center" bgcolor="#ffcccc"
| 50
| February 6, 1985
| @ New Jersey
| L 93–106
|
|
|
| Brendan Byrne Arena
| 34–16
|- align="center" bgcolor="#ffcccc"
| 51
| February 7, 1985
| Atlanta
| L 91–94 (OT)
|
|
|
| MECCA Arena
| 34–17
|- align="center"
|colspan="9" bgcolor="#bbcaff"|All-Star Break
|- style="background:#cfc;"
|- bgcolor="#bbffbb"
|- align="center" bgcolor="#ccffcc"
| 52
| February 12, 1985
| New Jersey
| W 111–103
|
|
|
| MECCA Arena
| 35–17
|- align="center" bgcolor="#ccffcc"
| 53
| February 14, 1985
| @ Indiana
| W 132–128 (OT)
|
|
|
| Market Square Arena
| 36–17
|- align="center" bgcolor="#ccffcc"
| 54
| February 17, 1985
| Chicago
| W 125–105
|
|
|
| MECCA Arena
| 37–17
|- align="center" bgcolor="#ccffcc"
| 55
| February 19, 1985
| @ New York
| W 129–118
|
|
|
| Madison Square Garden
| 38–17
|- align="center" bgcolor="#ccffcc"
| 56
| February 20, 1985
| @ Detroit
| W 113–112
|
|
|
| Pontiac Silverdome
| 39–17
|- align="center" bgcolor="#ffcccc"
| 57
| February 23, 1985
| @ Cleveland
| L 106–128
|
|
|
| Richfield Coliseum
| 39–18
|- align="center" bgcolor="#ccffcc"
| 58
| February 26, 1985
| Philadelphia
| W 116–97
|
|
|
| MECCA Arena
| 40–18
|- align="center" bgcolor="#ccffcc"
| 59
| February 27, 1985
| @ Utah
| W 119–100
|
|
|
| Salt Palace Acord Arena
| 41–18

|- align="center" bgcolor="#ffcccc"
| 60
| March 2, 1985
| @ Denver
| L 140–116
|
|
|
| McNichols Sports Arena
| 41–19
|- align="center" bgcolor="#ccffcc"
| 61
| March 5, 1985
| Seattle
| W 102–87
|
|
|
| MECCA Arena
| 42–19
|- align="center" bgcolor="#ccffcc"
| 62
| March 8, 1985
| Kansas City
| W 127–114
|
|
|
| MECCA Arena
| 43–19
|- align="center" bgcolor="#ccffcc"
| 63
| March 10, 1985
| Portland
| W 110–94
|
|
|
| MECCA Arena
| 44–19
|- align="center" bgcolor="#ccffcc"
| 64
| March 11, 1985
| @ Atlanta
| W 121–115
|
|
|
| The Omni
| 45–19
|- align="center" bgcolor="#ccffcc"
| 65
| March 13, 1985
| Cleveland
| W 128–93
|
|
|
| MECCA Arena
| 46–19
|- align="center" bgcolor="#ccffcc"
| 66
| March 16, 1985
| Phoenix
| W 125–96
|
|
|
| MECCA Arena
| 47–19
|- align="center" bgcolor="#ffcccc"
| 67
| March 17, 1985
| @ Chicago
| L 117–119 (OT)
|
|
|
| Chicago Stadium
| 47–20
|- align="center" bgcolor="#ccffcc"
| 68
| March 19, 1985
| New Jersey
| W 130–111
|
|
|
| MECCA Arena
| 48–20
|- align="center" bgcolor="#ffcccc"
| 69
| March 20, 1985
| @ Boston
| L 105–107
|
|
|
| Boston Garden
| 48–21
|- align="center" bgcolor="#ccffcc"
| 70
| March 22, 1985
| @ Philadelphia
| W 131–112
|
|
|
| The Spectrum
| 49–21
|- align="center" bgcolor="#ccffcc"
| 71
| March 23, 1985
| Indiana
| W 140–129
|
|
|
| MECCA Arena
| 50–21
|- align="center" bgcolor="#ccffcc"
| 72
| March 25, 1985
| New York
| W 126–106
|
|
|
| MECCA Arena
| 51–21
|- align="center" bgcolor="#ccffcc"
| 73
| March 26, 1985
| @ Washington
| W 107–96
|
|
|
| Capital Centre
| 52–21
|- align="center" bgcolor="#ccffcc"
| 74
| March 28, 1985
| @ New York
| W 121–116
|
|
|
| Madison Square Garden
| 53–21
|- align="center" bgcolor="#ccffcc"
| 75
| March 30, 1985
| Atlanta
| W 106–95
|
|
|
| MECCA Arena
| 54–21

|- align="center" bgcolor="#ccffcc"
| 76
| April 2, 1985
| Boston
| W 109–103
|
|
|
| MECCA Arena
| 55–21
|- align="center" bgcolor="#ccffcc"
| 77
| April 4, 1985
| Detroit
| W 130–121
|
|
|
| MECCA Arena
| 56–21
|- align="center" bgcolor="#ffcccc"
| 78
| April 6, 1985
| @ New Jersey
| L 104–108
|
|
|
| Brendan Byrne Arena
| 56–22
|- align="center" bgcolor="#ffcccc"
| 79
| April 7, 1985
| @ Detroit
| L 91–113
|
|
|
| Pontiac Silverdome
| 56–23
|- align="center" bgcolor="#ccffcc"
| 80
| April 10, 1985
| Washington
| W 106–97
|
|
|
| MECCA Arena
| 57–23
|- align="center" bgcolor="#ccffcc"
| 81
| April 12, 1985
| @ Boston
| W 115–113 (OT)
|
|
|
| Boston Garden
| 58–23
|- align="center" bgcolor="#ccffcc"
| 82
| April 13, 1985
| New York
| W 88–84
|
|
|
| MECCA Arena
| 59–23

Playoffs

|- align="center" bgcolor="#ccffcc"
| 1
| April 19, 1985
| Chicago
| W 109–100
| Moncrief (30)
| Mokeski (10)
| Pressey (9)
| MECCA Arena11,052
| 1–0
|- align="center" bgcolor="#ccffcc"
| 2
| April 21, 1985
| Chicago
| W 122–115
| Cummings (30)
| Cummings (9)
| Cummings (11)
| MECCA Arena11,052
| 2–0
|- align="center" bgcolor="#ffcccc"
| 3
| April 24, 1985
| @ Chicago
| L 107–109
| Cummings (37)
| Cummings (9)
| Moncrief, Pressey (5)
| Chicago Stadium17,225
| 2–1
|- align="center" bgcolor="#ccffcc"
| 4
| April 26, 1985
| @ Chicago
| W 105–97
| Cummings (29)
| Cummings (12)
| Pressey (4)
| Chicago Stadium17,787
| 3–1
|-

|- align="center" bgcolor="#ffcccc"
| 1
| April 28, 1985
| Philadelphia
| L 105–127
| Cummings (17)
| Pressey (10)
| Hodges, Pressey (8)
| MECCA Arena11,052
| 0–1
|- align="center" bgcolor="#ffcccc"
| 2
| April 30, 1985
| Philadelphia
| L 108–112
| Cummings (41)
| Cummings, Lister (12)
| Pressey (16)
| MECCA Arena11,052
| 0–2
|- align="center" bgcolor="#ffcccc"
| 3
| May 3, 1985
| @ Philadelphia
| L 104–109
| Cummings (21)
| Cummings, Lister (8)
| Pressey (7)
| The Spectrum14,188
| 0–3
|- align="center" bgcolor="#ffcccc"
| 4
| May 5, 1985
| @ Philadelphia
| L 112–121
| Moncrief, Pressey (25)
| Lister (14)
| Moncrief (8)
| The Spectrum15,264
| 0–4
|-

Player statistics
Source:

Season

Playoffs

Awards and records
 Don Nelson, NBA Coach of the Year Award
 Sidney Moncrief, All-NBA Second Team
 Terry Cummings, All-NBA Second Team
 Sidney Moncrief, NBA All-Defensive First Team
 Paul Pressey, NBA All-Defensive First Team

Transactions

Trades

References

See also
 1984-85 NBA season

Milwaukee Bucks seasons
Mil
Milwaukee Bucks
Milwaukee Bucks